The men's 400 metres event at the 2003 Summer Universiade was held in Daegu, South Korea with the final on 25–27 August.

Medalists

Results

Heats

Quarterfinals

Semifinals

Final

References
Results
Heats, quarterfinal results

Athletics at the 2003 Summer Universiade
2003